Miss Universe 1959, the 8th Miss Universe pageant, was held on 24 July 1959 at Long Beach Municipal Auditorium in Long Beach, California, United States. 34 contestants competed and in the end Akiko Kojima of Japan won the competition, becoming the first Asian woman to win the title. She was crowned by Luz Marina Zuluaga from Colombia. This was the last year that the pageant was held in Long Beach before it moved to Miami Beach, Florida in 1960, before the establishment of the Miss International pageant.

Results

Placements

Contestants

  - Liana Cortijo
  - Christine Spatzier
  - Hélène Savigny
  - Corina Taborga
  - Vera Regina Ribeiro
  - Than Than Aye
  - Eileen Butter
  - Olga Pumajero Korkor
  - Zianne Monturiol
  - Irma Buesa Mas
  - Lisa Stolberg
  - Carlota Elena Ayala
  - Pamela Anne Searle
  - Françoise Saint-Laurent
  - Carmela Künzel
  - Zoitsa Kouroukli †
  - Rogelia Cruz Martínez †
  Hawaii - Patricia Visser
  - Peggy Erwich
  - Sigríður Þorvaldsdóttir
  - Rina Issacov
  - Maria Grazia Buccella
  - Akiko Kojima
  - Oh Hyun-joo
  - Josée Pundel
  - Mirna García Dávila
  - Jorunn Kristjansen
  - Guadalupe Mariátegui Hawkins
  - Zuzanna Cembrzowska
  - Marie Louise Ekström
  - Sodsai Vanijvadhana
  - Ecel Olcay
  - Claudia Bernat
  - Terry Lynn Huntingdon

Notes

Debuts

Designation
  - Sodsai Vanijvadhana was appointed by the pageant organizers in that time with the coordinations from the Royal Thai Consulate in Los Angeles. Sodsai was an exchange student in UCLA at the time before she competed in the pageant.

Did not compete
  - Arlenne Nesgitt
  - Christine Matias
  - Nawal Ramli

Awards
  - Miss Friendship (Sodsai Vanijvadhana)
  - Miss Photogenic (Pamela Anne Searle)
  - Most Popular Girl (Oh Hyun-joo)

References

1959
1959 in California
1959 beauty pageants
Beauty pageants in the United States
July 1959 events in the United States